Rojahn is a surname. Notable people with the surname include:

Birgitte Cornelia Rojahn (1839–1927), Norwegian stage actress, concert singer and voice trainer
Ernst Rojahn (1909–1977), Norwegian chess player
Ferdinand A. Rojahn (1822–1900), German musician, organist, violinist and conductor

See also 
Rojan (disambiguation)